Sofie Hornemann (born 1 April 2002) is a Danish football player who plays as a striker for KoldingQ in Denmark top-division Elitedivisionen and previously for the Danish national junior team.

International career
She participated at the 2019 UEFA Women's Under-17 Championship in Bulgaria.

Hornemann made her debut for the Denmark junior national team on 28 August 2019 against the England in Staffordshire.

Career statistics

Club
As of 11 September 2021.

References

External links
 Profile at the Danish Football Union
 Sofie Hornemann at Soccerdonna
 
 

2002 births
Living people
Danish women's footballers
Denmark women's international footballers
Women's association football midfielders
Sportspeople from Aalborg